Luciferin is a generic term for the light-emitting compound found in organisms that generate bioluminescence. Luciferins typically undergo an enzyme-catalyzed reaction with molecular oxygen. The resulting transformation, which usually involves splitting off a molecular fragment, produces an excited state intermediate that emits light upon decaying to its ground state. The term may refer to molecules that are substrates for both luciferases and photoproteins.

Types 
Luciferins are a class of small-molecule substrates that react with oxygen in the presence of a luciferase (an enzyme) to release energy in the form of light. It is not known just how many types of luciferins there are, but some of the better-studied compounds are listed below. 

Because of the chemical diversity of luciferins, there is no clear unifying mechanism of action, except that all require molecular oxygen, The variety of luciferins and luciferases, their diverse reaction mechanisms and the scattered phylogenetic distribution indicate that many of them have arisen independently in the course of evolution.

Firefly 

Firefly luciferin is the luciferin found in many Lampyridae species. It is the substrate of beetle luciferases (EC 1.13.12.7) responsible for the characteristic yellow light emission from fireflies, though can cross-react to produce light with related enzymes from non-luminous species. The chemistry is unusual, as adenosine triphosphate (ATP) is required for light emission, in addition to molecular oxygen.

Snail 

Latia luciferin is, in terms of chemistry, (E)-2-methyl-4-(2,6,6-trimethyl-1-cyclohex-1-yl)-1-buten-1-ol formate and is from the freshwater snail Latia neritoides.

Bacterial 

Bacterial luciferin is two-component system consisting of flavin mononucleotide and a fatty aldehyde found in bioluminescent bacteria.

Coelenterazine 

Coelenterazine is found in radiolarians, ctenophores, cnidarians, squid, brittle stars, copepods, chaetognaths, fish, and shrimp. It is the prosthetic group in the protein aequorin responsible for the blue light emission.

Dinoflagellate 

Dinoflagellate luciferin is a chlorophyll derivative (i. e. a tetrapyrrole) and is found in some dinoflagellates, which are often responsible for the phenomenon of nighttime glowing waves (historically this was called phosphorescence, but is a misleading term). A very similar type of luciferin is found in some types of euphausiid shrimp.

Vargulin 

Vargulin is found in certain ostracods and deep-sea fish, to be specific, Poricthys. Like the compound coelenterazine, it is an imidazopyrazinone and emits primarily blue light in the animals.

Fungi 

Foxfire is the bioluminescence created by some species of fungi present in decaying wood. While there may be multiple different luciferins within the kingdom of fungi, 3-hydroxy hispidin was determined to be the luciferin in the fruiting bodies of several species of fungi, including Neonothopanus nambi, Omphalotus olearius, Omphalotus nidiformis, and Panellus stipticus.

Usage in science 
Luciferin is widely used in science and medicine as a method of in vivo imaging, using living organisms to non-invasively detect images and in molecular imaging. The reaction between luciferin substrate paired with the receptor enzyme luciferase produces a catalytic reaction, generating bioluminescence. This reaction and the luminescence produced is useful for imaging such as detecting tumors from cancer or capable of measuring gene expression.

References

External links 
 

Biological pigments
Bioluminescence
Fluorescent dyes
Luciferins